Stupida is the first EP by Italian singer Alessandra Amoroso. It includes the single "Immobile", which brought her national fame when she performed it on the television talent show Amici di Maria De Filippi and the title track "Stupida", also a successful single release.

The EP sold 35,000 copies on the first day after release. Within ten days it had reached platinum status by exceeding 70,000 units sold. On May 23, 2009, the EP had sold 140,000 copies and was certified double platinum. By July 2012, it had been certified triple platinum by the Federation of the Italian Music Industry.

Track listing
 Stupida - 3:36
 Splendida follia - 3:45
 Immobile - 3:21
 È ora di te - 3:39
 Stella incantevole - 3:51
 Da qui - 3:33
 X ora, x un po''' - 3:50

Charts

EP

Singles

Stupida Tour

In the summer of 2009 Alessandra Amoroso performed at over fifty concerts in Italy and including the Amiche per l'Abruzzo benefit gala organized by Laura Pausini  and the Wind Music Awards. She also took part in all rounds of the Amici di Maria De Filippi talent show and several stages of the Radio Norba Battiti Live Tour.

Personnel
Alessandra Amoroso - vocals

Setlist
The order and choice of songs varied from show to show and included:

 Stupida Immobile Find a way Stella incantevole Splendida follia Da qui X ora, x un po' Estranei a partire da ieri*
 If I Ain't Got You (cover of Alicia Keys)
 Respect (cover of Aretha Franklin)
 Think (cover of Aretha Franklin)
 Chasing Pavements (cover of Adele)
 Almeno tu nell'universo (cover of Mia Martini)
 True colors (cover of Cyndi Lauper)
 Ancora ancora ancora  (cover of Mina)
 Rehab (cover of Amy Winehouse)
 No one (cover of Alicia Keys)
 Feeling Better (cover of Malika Ayane)
 Rain on Your Parade (cover of Duffy)
 Can't Take My Eyes off You (cover of Frankie Valli)
 One'' (cover of U2)

* First sung on August 30 at Gallipoli.

Tour dates

Sources

2009 debut EPs
Alessandra Amoroso albums